Pure Oil Company was an American petroleum company founded in 1914 and sold to what is now Union Oil Company of California in 1965.  The Pure Oil name returned in 1993 as a cooperative (based in Rock Hill, South Carolina since 2008) which has grown to supply 350 members in 10 Southern states.

History

Three companies operating in the United States have used the Pure Oil name. The first began as a group of independent oil refiners, producers, and pipeline operators, in fall 1895 in Butler, Pennsylvania, with headquarters in Pittsburgh, although it was incorporated in New Jersey. Pure was organized by independent interests to counter to the dominance of Standard Oil Company in the Pennsylvania oil fields, and was the second vertically integrated oil company (after Standard) in the region.  Operations were based in Oil City, Pennsylvania. David Kirk was elected the first president.  He was succeeded in 1896 by James W. Lee.

Pure Oil sold illuminating oil in Philadelphia and New York City. The company also built bulk terminals in Amsterdam and Hamburg and competed in Europe with Standard Oil, the Nobel and Rothschild families, and Deutsche Bank.

Pure Oil Producing Co. was incorporated in 1902. In 1904 a refinery was built on the Delaware River which received  from the United States Pipe Line. The Pennoil tanker delivered oil to Europe.

Beman Gates Dawes and his brothers, whose Columbus-based Ohio Cities Gas Company had begun in 1914, made an offer of $24.50 a share for the company. Dawes was building an Oklahoma refinery, and Pure Oil had production capabilities there which would benefit his company. The Pennsylvania company accepted the offer and made $22 million in profit on the sale.

In 1920, Ohio Cities Gas Company's name changed to Pure Oil. In 1926, the headquarters moved to Chicago. Refineries were located in Ohio, West Virginia, Oklahoma, and Texas.  A Pure Oil Gas Station, built in 1933 and located at Saratoga Springs, New York, was listed on the National Register of Historic Places in 1978.

In the late 1920s Pure Oil made a contract to deliver gasoline and oil to another Ohio gasoline company, Hickok Oil Corporation of Toledo Ohio. The contract called for Pure Oil to be paid in stock such that on August 1, 1945, Pure Oil would own Hickok. When Pure Oil took control of Hickok they rebranded the "Hi-Speed" gas stations as "Pure". The Hi-Speed stations were built of white-glazed brick, with an iconic square tower over the door, about 1/4 the width of the building and slightly taller than the height of the rest of the building which had a flat roof.

By the 1960s, sales were $700 million a year, and Pure Oil ranked as one of the country's 100 largest industrial companies. Over 1,000 worked in the Chicago area. The headquarters at that time were located in unincorporated Palatine, Illinois now Schaumburg, Illinois, in a building which is now a campus of Roosevelt University. The company motto was "Be sure with Pure."

Union Oil Company of California purchased Pure Oil in 1965. Shortly after acquisition by Union Oil, Pure Oil's Refining & Marketing operations became the Pure Oil Division of Union Oil Company of California with the Pure Oil name continuing in full force. By 1970, the Pure Oil brand was phased out, and remaining service stations and auto/truck stops were rebranded as Union 76.  The Pure Oil Division was merged with Union Oil's west coast Refining & Marketing division to become the Union 76 division. 
 
After 1970, the Pure Oil name was retained as a registered trademark, while the Firebird brand name was retained and used primarily for motor oils and lubricants that were not extensively marketed toward consumers.

In 1992, Unocal announced plans to end Southeast operations.  The 76 brand is currently owned by Phillips 66 while Unocal was later bought by Chevron Corporation.

In 1996, Pure Oil became the holding company for three independent pipeline companies. By 1997, operations in Europe ended.

Pure, and later Union 76, was "The official fuel of NASCAR", a relationship that lasted over 50 years, ending in 2003.  Sunoco has since replaced 76 as the official fuel of NASCAR.

Pure Oil Jobbers Cooperative
The Southeastern Oil Jobbers Cooperative, Inc., began as a result of Unocal's departure from the Southeast. Independent operators wanted a cooperative "of marketers, by marketers, and for marketers", which would let members make decisions on their own. Each member joins by buying a share of stock and paying an initiation fee. Since 1996, the members have received a dividend every year.

The cooperative provides signs and images to member stations for consistent marketing of its products. It has the right to the Pure brand name and Firebird logo for selling Pure and SOJO petroleum products in Florida, Georgia, Alabama, Mississippi, Louisiana, Arkansas, Tennessee, North Carolina, South Carolina, and Virginia. It also has the right to expand the use of the name and trademark anywhere in the United States.

In 2008, the cooperative had changed its name to Pure Oil Jobbers Cooperative and moved its headquarters to Rock Hill.

See also
Pure Oil Service Station (disambiguation) Pure Oil Service Stations

References

External links
Pure Oil Jobbers Cooperative, Inc.
Pure Oil photos

Defunct oil companies of the United States
Defunct companies based in Texas
Petroleum in Texas
Union Oil Company of California
Energy companies established in 1895
Non-renewable resource companies established in 1895
Non-renewable resource companies disestablished in 1965
1895 establishments in Pennsylvania
1965 disestablishments in Illinois
1965 mergers and acquisitions